William Anthony Leonard (1949 – March 9, 1968) was a 19 year old African-American teenager who was shot and killed by an LAPD officer Larry N. Fultz.

Shooting 
Leonard had been babysitting for Augustus and Barbara Mallard at 557 W. Imperial Hwy., to earn extra money. Police showed up at the home in response to a call that August Mallard had been threatening to kill his wife Barbara. Upon arrival, officers found August Mallard waving a pistol, Fultz approached a back window to question Barbara Mallard when he saw Leonard opening a window in the bathroom of the home. Lutz shot and killed Leonard, who had his arms raised and was facing away from the window.

Following his death in 1968, Jeff and Josephine Leonard filed a lawsuit for $1,000,000. Los Angeles City Council recommended it be denied, but voted unanimously to award a $25,000 settlement 4 years later in 1972. It was the first settlement for police misconduct in Los Angeles' history.

References 

African Americans shot dead by law enforcement officers in the United States
Law enforcement controversies in the United States
1968 deaths
Los Angeles Police Department